"Between Two Fires" is a song written by Jan Buckingham, Sam Lorber and J.D. Martin, and recorded by American country music artist Gary Morris.  It was released in April 1984 as the first single from the album Faded Blue.  The song reached #7 on the Billboard Hot Country Singles & Tracks chart.

Chart performance

References

1984 singles
Gary Morris songs
Song recordings produced by Bob Montgomery (songwriter)
Warner Records singles
Songs written by Sam Lorber
1984 songs
Songs written by J. D. Martin (songwriter)